Limor Magen Telem (born 17 March 1971) is an Israeli politician. She was a member of Knesset for Yisrael Beiteinu.

Biography
Born Limor Magen, she was raised in Haifa and attended the Hebrew Reali School. Aged 17, she took part in the Miss Israel 1988 pageant coming in second place, and was crowned Miss Europe Israel the same year. During her national service, she served in the Israeli Navy.

Magen-Telem studied law at the University of Haifa, attaining a Master of Laws. She worked as an attorney and then as a legal advisor to the Migdal Haemek municipality between 2001 and 2021.

She was placed ninth on the Yisrael Beiteinu list for the 2021 elections. Although the party won only eight seats, she entered the Knesset on 15 June 2021 as a replacement for Oded Forer, after he was appointed to the cabinet and resigned from the Knesset under the Norwegian Law.

References

External links

Living people
Members of the 24th Knesset (2021–2022)
Women members of the Knesset
Yisrael Beiteinu politicians
Miss Israel delegates
People from Haifa
1971 births
Beauty queen-politicians
Miss Europe